This is a list of the National Register of Historic Places listings in Briscoe County, Texas.

This is intended to be a complete list of properties listed on the National Register of Historic Places in Briscoe County, Texas. There are two properties listed on the National Register within the county.

Current listings

The locations of National Register properties may be seen in a mapping service provided.

|}

See also

National Register of Historic Places listings in Texas
Recorded Texas Historic Landmarks in Briscoe County

References

External links

Briscoe County, Texas
Briscoe County
Buildings and structures in Briscoe County, Texas